SS Bengrove was a steam-powered collier registered in Liverpool, England. Thousands of people on shore saw her explode and sink in the Bristol Channel on Sunday, 7 March 1915.

The ship left Barry at about 4:00 am under sealed orders and carrying a cargo of 5,000 tons of coal. Later that day, in the Bristol Channel, about five miles off the coast of Ilfracombe, an explosion occurred under the vessel amidships. The ship's siren was activated and the crew entered the lifeboats. The siren was heard on shore and the Ilfracombe coast guard sent lifeboats to the area. There were 21 other steamers in the area at the time of the explosion and six of them offered assistance to the foundering vessel. All 33 crew were saved and taken to Ilfracombe pier. Early reports were unsure what had caused the explosion. There was speculation that the vessel had struck a mine or torpedo. The cause was later determined to have been a torpedo fired from German U-boat .

References

1910 ships
Ships built on the River Tees
World War I merchant ships of the United Kingdom
Shipwrecks in the Bristol Channel
Maritime incidents in 1915
World War I shipwrecks in the Atlantic Ocean
History of Devon
Colliers
Ships sunk by German submarines in World War I